Gossip is a 1923 American silent drama film directed by King Baggot and starring Gladys Walton, Ramsey Wallace and Albert Prisco.

Cast
 Gladys Walton as Caroline Weatherbee
 Ramsey Wallace as Hiram Ward
 Albert Prisco as John Magoo
 Freeman Wood as Robert Williamson
 Carol Holloway as Mrs. Boyne

References

Bibliography
 Munden, Kenneth White. The American Film Institute Catalog of Motion Pictures Produced in the United States, Part 1. University of California Press, 1997.

External links
 

1923 films
1923 drama films
1920s English-language films
American silent feature films
Silent American drama films
American black-and-white films
Films directed by King Baggot
Universal Pictures films
1920s American films